A list of animated feature films first released in 1978.

Highest-grossing animated films of the year

See also
 List of animated television series of 1978

References

Feature films
1978
1978-related lists